Egon is a variant of the male given name Egino.  It is most commonly found in Austria, the Czech Republic, Germany, Estonia, Hungary, Slovakia, Sweden, Denmark, and parts of the Netherlands and Belgium. Egon may refer to:

People
 Egon VIII of Fürstenberg-Heiligenberg (1588–1635), Imperial Count of Fürstenberg-Heiligenberg (1618–1635) and a military leader in the Thirty Years' War
 Egon Bahr (1922–2015), German politician
 Egon Bondy (1930–2007), Czech philosopher
 Egon Coordes (born 1944), German footballer and coach
 Egon Eiermann (1904–1970), German architect
 Egon Franke (fencer) (born 1935), Polish Olympic fencer
 Egon Franke (politician) (1913–1995), German politician
 Egon Frid (born 1957), Swedish politician
 Egon Friedell (1878–1938), Austrian writer
 Egon Freiherr von Eickstedt (1892-1965), German physical anthropologist
 Egon Guttman(1927-2021), German-American legal scholar
 Egon Jönsson (1921–2000), Swedish footballer
 Egon Kaur (born 1987), Estonian rally driver
 Egon Kisch (1885–1948), Czechoslovak writer
 Egon Köhnen (born 1947), German footballer
 Egon Krenz (born 1937), German politician, last leader of East Germany
 Egon Mayer  (1917–1944), German fighter pilot during World War II
 Egon Müller (born 1948) German former international motorcycle speedway rider
 Egon Nuter (born 1955), Estonian actor
 Egon Pearson (1895–1980), British statistician
 Egon Petri (1881–1962), Dutch pianist
 Egon Piechaczek (1931–2006), Polish footballer and football manager
 Egon Ramms (born 1948), German general
 Egon Rannet (1911–1983), Estonian writer
 Egon Ronay (1915–2010), Hungarian food critic and writer in the UK and Ireland
 Egon Roolaid (1918–1943), Estonian freestyle swimmer
 Egon Schiele (1890–1918), Austrian painter
 Egon Scotland (1948–1991), German journalist
 Egon Sendler (1923–2014), French Roman Catholic priest
 Egon von Fürstenberg (1946–2004), German fashion designer
 Egon von Vietinghoff (1903–1994), Swiss painter
 Egon Wellesz (1885–1974), Austrian, later British composer
 Egon Wolff (1926–2016), Chilean playwright
 Egon Zimmermann (1939–2019), Austrian alpine skier
Eothen "Egon" Alapatt (1970s– ), American music executive

Fictional characters
Egon Olsen, the mob boss in the Olsen Gang films.
Egon Spengler, the scientist in the Ghostbusters series.
Egon Tiedemann, the chief of police of Winden in the German television series Dark.

Business organizations
Egon (restaurants), a restaurant chain in Norway

Masculine given names
German masculine given names
Czech masculine given names
Danish masculine given names
Dutch masculine given names
Estonian masculine given names
Norwegian masculine given names
Swedish masculine given names